Ngô Quyền High School ( or ) was one of the first schools in Đồng Nai Province. It was founded in 1956.

History
In 2003, the school had six of its teachers certified as excellent teachers at the provincial level while being awarded 109 provincial-level prizes for its gifted students and seeing 20 percent of its students gaining honored certificates. In the same school year, all of its 12th-grade students passed their graduation exams, with 46 percent of these students passing college or university entrance exams.

The school's headmaster, Nguyen Duy Phuc, said that to satisfy students' demand, in early March each year, the school coordinates with the Department of Education and Training in Đồng Nai Province to open meetings providing advice related to universities' enrollment for 12th-grade students. The school also posted military colleges and universities' enrollment reports to encourage its students to apply for participating in exams to be enrolled at these colleges and universities.

With its achievements, the school was awarded a third-grade Labor Order by the President in 1994, and a second-grade Labor Order by the President in 1998. Most recently, the school gained a first-prize for the whole group at the first military sport festival of Đồng Nai education sector.

Principals

External links
 - The school on Facebook
 - School website

High schools in Vietnam
High schools for the gifted in Vietnam
Schools in Vietnam
Educational institutions established in 1956
1956 establishments in Vietnam